The Far North Football League (formerly the Woomera & Districts Football League) is an Australian rules football competition based in the Far North region of South Australia.  It is an affiliated member of the South Australian National Football League.

Current clubs

Brief history 
The Woomera Football League (WFL) was formed in 1949.   
The predominance of public service and defence employment in the region was reflected in early participating clubs which included Works & Housing, Contractors, Koolymilka, Lines & Construction, LRWER (Long Range Weapons Experimental Range), RAAF (Royal Australian Air Force), RAE (Royal Australian Engineers - Army).  
By 1960 the clubs consisted of Works, Village, Centrals, RAAF and Koolymilka.  
RAAF withdrew in 1966 and Works similarly in 1976.  
Mount Gunson joined in 1975 and ceased in 1983. 
Woomera North joined in 1977. This was a direct result of Works and Village unable to field separate sides so a new team was formed. Woomera North voted itself out of existence in 1984 and a Village team re-entered the competition which then only consisted of 3 teams viz. Kollymilka, Central and Village. 
Another interesting team was the J.D.S.C.S. Warriors who played between 1985 & 1987. The team was mainly made up of USA Servicemen from the Joint Defence Space Communication Station located at Nurrungar just outside Woomera. In 3 years they only won 2 matches but did play in a final series.

WFL Premiers and Runners-up 1949 -1985Footypedia

WFL Premiership Summary 1949 - 1985 

1.L.C.P.S. (Signals) is the acronym for No.1 Line Construction Project Squadron, Royal Australian Corps of Signals.

1.L.C.P.S. (Signals) were also known as Lines and Construction.

Works were also known as Works and Housing in the early years.

Village were also known as Woomera or Town in the early years.

In 1986 the Woomera Football League changed its name to the Woomera & Districts Football League.  

Since this era, with the beginning of mining operations at Olympic Dam in the 1980s, the majority of the league's clubs are actually located in the Roxby Downs area rather than Woomera, with the Coober Pedy Saints even further afield.

WFL League B&F - Area Medal(1949-1985), Mail Medal (1953-2021), Leading Goalkicker 

In 1999, as indicated by *, the Mail Medal was awarded retrospectively to Don Watson (1957), Warren Coops (1959), Alan Hancock (1969) and Dave Davis (1984).

1949 1st Year of Competition   

Minor & Major rounds details not available. Teams for this year are those competing only. Not the final ladder. Works & Housing were undefeated until the Grand Final.

Best in Grand Final: Welsh (1 L.C.P.S.), Crack (Works & Housing).

1950 Ladder 

Best in Grand Final: Unknown.

1951 Ladder 

Best in Grand Final: Unknown.

1952 Ladder 

Best in Grand Final: E M Liebelt (Village), B Flanegan (Works).

1953 Ladder 

Best in Grand Final: Neil Kerley (Koolymilka), Hale (Works).

Neil Kerley won Mail Medal with 29 votes; 9 firsts and 2 thirds from 12 matches.

1954 Ladder 

Best in Grand Final: Jimmy Neeson (Village), Peter Turnbull (Works).

1955 Ladder 

Best in Grand Final:  A Higgie (Works), Rankin (RAAF).

1956 Ladder 

Best in Grand Final: Milton Maczkowiack (Works), Archie Ryan (Centrals).

1957 Ladder 

Best in Grand Final: Bill Sheehan (Village), Mick McCarthy (Works).

1958 Ladder 

Best in Grand Final: Bob Ortmann (Works), Archie Ryan (Centrals).

1959 Ladder 

Best in Grand Final: John Heppell (Village), Don Lahey (Centrals).

1960 Ladder 

Best in Grand Final: R Smith (Centrals), Bob Ortmann (Works).

1961 Ladder 

Best in Grand Final: Bluey Waller (Village), Ron Weser (Works).

1962 Ladder 

Best in Grand Final: Neil Williams (Works).

1963 Ladder 

Best in Grand Final: Geoff Dyke (Village), Fred Jurgens (Centrals).

1964 Ladder 

Best in Grand Final: Fred Wernert (Works).

1965 Ladder 

Best in Grand Final: Bill Hooker (Village), Ray Whitaker (Works).

1966 Ladder 

Best in Grand Final: Jurgen Wagnitz (Works), Ken Rau (Village).

1967 Ladder 

Best in Grand Final: Brian Dempsey (Village).

1968 Ladder 

Best in Grand Final: Jurgen Wagnitz (Works), Neville Johnstone (Centrals).

1969 Ladder 

Best in Grand Final: Brian Dempsey (Village), Rex Quick (Centrals).

1970 Ladder 

Best in Grand Final: Bob Brandt (Village), Rex Quick (Centrals).

1971 Ladder 

Best in Grand Final: Gary Hele (Village), Dave Owen (Works).

1972 Ladder 

Best in Grand Final: Mick Hancock (Koolymilka), Bob Brandt (Village).

1973 Ladder 

Best in Grand Final: Paul Sargeant (Koolymilka), Gavin Hitch (Works).

1974 Ladder 

Best in Grand Final: Garry Thomas (Works), Chiesa (Koolymilka).

1975 Ladder 

Best in Grand Final: Rick Daly (Koolymilka), Peter Tattersall (Centrals).

1976 Ladder 

Best in Grand Final: Angelo Mele (Centrals), R Ireland (Mt. Gunson).

1977 Ladder 

Best in Grand Final: Gavin Hitch (Norths), Cox (Centrals).

1978 Ladder 

Best in Grand Final: Peter Ault (Norths), Phil Ward (Centrals).

1979 Ladder 

Best in Grand Final: John Shepherdson (Norths), Kelly Hill (Mt. Gunson).

1980 Ladder 

Best in Grand Final: Jim Richards (Centrals), Chris Foster (Koolymilka).

1981 Ladder 

Best in Grand Final: John Hearne (Mt. Gunson), John Shepherdson (Norths).

1982 Ladder 

Best in Grand Final: ? (Mt. Gunson), ? (Norths).

1983 Ladder 

Best in Grand Final: All played well (Koolymilka), Mick Weber (Norths).

1984 Ladder 

Best in Grand Final: John Shepherdson (Centrals), Peter Koenig (Koolymilka).

1985 Ladder 

Best in Grand Final: ? (Koolymilka), ? (Village).

1986 Ladder 

Best in Grand Final: Stephen Dryburgh (Roxby Districts), Roy Menner (Centrals).

1987 Ladder 

Koolymilka and JDSCS Warriors deducted points for playing unregistered players*.

Two games were canceled between Olympic Dam -v- JDSCS and Olympic Dam -v- Roxby Districts.

Best in Grand Final: ? (Olympic Dam), ? (Roxby Districts).

1988 Ladder 

Best in Grand Final: ? (Roxby Districts), Bob Evans (Centrals).

1989 Ladder 

Best in Grand Final: ? (Roxby Districts), ? (Andamooka).

1990 Ladder 

Minor & Major rounds details not available. Andamooka undefeated.

Best in Grand Final: ? (Andamooka), ? (Roxby Districts).

1991 Ladder 

Best in Grand Final: D Pridham (Roxby Districts), ? (Andamooka).

1992 Ladder 

Bungala forfeited one game against Roxby Districts due to a misunderstanding*.

Best in Grand Final: ? (Olympic Dam), ? (Andamooka).

1993 Ladder 

Minor & Major rounds details not available. Leigh Creek did not complete the full season. Olympic Dam lost one game for the season.

Best in Grand Final: ? (Olympic Dam), ? (Bungala).

1994 Ladder 

Minor & Major rounds details not available. 

Best in Grand Final: ? (Olympic Dam), ? (Andamooka).

1995 Ladder 

Best in Grand Final: Stuart Nunn (Andamooka), ? (Roxby Districts).

1996 Ladder 

Minor & Major rounds details not available. Umeewarra last game 07/07/1996. Olympic Dam undefeated.

Best in Grand Final: ? (Olympic Dam), ? (Roxby Districts).

1997 Ladder 

Minor & Major rounds details not available. Hornridge 1st season. Olympic Dam undefeated.

Best in Grand Final: ? (Olympic Dam), ? (Andamooka).

1998 Ladder 

Minor & Major rounds details not available. Andamooka Minor Premiers.

Best in Grand Final: ? (Olympic Dam), ? (Roxby Districts).

1999 Ladder 

Minor & Major rounds details not available. Roxby Districts Minor Premiers.

Best in Grand Final: ? (Roxby Districts), ? (Hornridge).

2000 Ladder 

 
Best in Grand Final: ? (Roxby Districts), ? (Andamooka).

2001 Ladder 

Some Minor & Major rounds details are not available. 

Best in Grand Final: ? (Hornridge), ? (Roxby Districts).

2002 Ladder 

Best in Grand Final: ? (Hornridge), ? (Andamooka).

2003 Ladder 

Best in Grand Final: Jae Perkins (Andamooka), ? (Olympic Dam).

2004 Ladder 

Best in Grand Final: ? (Olympic Dam), ? (Roxby Districts).

2005 Ladder 

Coober Pedy forfeited one game against Hornridge.

Best in Grand Final: Paul Kemp (Olympic Dam), Ricky Prosser (Roxby Districts).

2006 Ladder 

Best in Grand Final: N Burton (Olympic Dam), Ricky Prosser (Roxby Districts).

2007 Ladder 

Best in Grand Final: Michael Uhlik (Andamooka), A Petty (Olympic Dam).

2008 Ladder 

Best in Grand Final: Dion McKenna (Olympic Dam), Tristan Baldy (Roxby Districts).

2009 Ladder 

Best in Grand Final: Tyson Hornhardt (Olympic Dam), D McGrath (Roxby Districts).

2010 Ladder 

Best in Grand Final: Ricky Prosser (Roxby Districts), C Taylour (Olympic Dam).

2011 Ladder 

Best in Grand Final: Rian Hornhardt (Olympic Dam), A Schiller (Andamooka).

2012 Ladder 

Best in Grand Final: Trent Grosser (Hornridge), J Kamanski (Roxby Districts).

2013 Ladder 

Best in Grand Final: Jared Greenbank (Roxby Districts), S Schwartz (Hornridge).

2014 Ladder 

Best in Grand Final: Jordan Mandemaker (Roxby Districts), Tim Milner (Hornridge).

2015 Ladder 

Best in Grand Final: James Telfer (Roxby Districts), Simon Henke (Hornridge).

2016 Ladder 

Best in Grand Final: Brett Chesson (Roxby Districts), Lewis Grantham (East Roxby).

2017 Ladder 

Best in Grand Final: Dylan Gamble (Roxby Districts), Shannon Haynes (Hornridge).

2018 Ladder 

Best in Grand Final: K Lynch (Hornridge), Ben Scott (Roxby Districts).

2019 Ladder 

Best in Grand Final: Brendan Lehmann (Hornridge), Karl Muller (East Roxby).

2020 Ladder - No competition due to Covid 19 virus.

2021 Ladder 

Best in Grand Final:  Waylon Johncock (Hornridge), Michael Shaw (Olympic Dam).

2022 Ladder 

Best in Grand Final: ?  (Olympic Dam), ? (Hornridge).

Life Members

References

External links 
 country footy

Books
 Encyclopedia of South Australian country football clubs / compiled by Peter Lines. 
 South Australian country football digest / by Peter Lines 

Australian rules football competitions in South Australia
Far North (South Australia)